The second I-22 was one of five Type C cruiser submarines of the C1 sub-class built of the Imperial Japanese Navy. During World War II, she operated as the mother ship for a midget submarine during the attack on Pearl Harbor and the attack on Sydney Harbour, supported Japanese forces during the Battle of the Coral Sea, and served in the Guadalcanal campaign. She was sunk in October 1942.

Design and description
They displaced  surfaced and  submerged.

For surface running, the boats were powered by two  diesel engines, each driving one propeller shaft. When submerged each propeller was driven by a  electric motor. They could reach  on the surface and  underwater.

The boats were armed with eight internal bow  torpedo tubes and carried a total of 20 torpedoes. They were also armed with a single /40 deck gun and two single or twin mounts for  Type 96 anti-aircraft guns. They were equipped to carry one Type A midget submarine aft of the conning tower.

Construction and commissioning
Ordered under the 3rd Naval Armaments Supplement Programme and built by Kawasaki at Kobe, Japan, I-22 was laid down on 25 November 1937 with the name Submarine No. 47. While she was on the building ways, she was renamed I-22, the second submarine of that number, the first I-22 being renumbered  on 1 June 1938 to make the number I-22 available for her. She was launched on 23 December 1938 and was completed and commissioned on 10 March 1941.

Service history

Pre-World War II
Upon commissioning, I-22 was attached to the Yokosuka Naval District and assigned to the Yokosuka Guard Unit Training Squadron. She was reassigned to Submarine Division 3 in Submarine Squadron 1 in the 6th Fleet on 15 July 1941.

On 22 October 1941, I-22 moved from Saeki to the Kure Naval Arsenal in Kure. At Kure, she became the first submarine to undergo conversion into a mother ship for a Type A midget submarine. On 30 October 1941, I-22 replaced the submarine  as flagship of Submarine Division 3.

At the Kure Navy Club in Kure on 17 November 1941, the commander of Submarine Division 3 briefed the commanding officers of the five converted submarines on the upcoming attack on Pearl Harbor and on the role of their submarines in it. He had been designated the commander of the Special Attack Unit, made up of all five submarines, each of which was to launch a Type A midget submarine off Pearl Harbor so that the midget submarines could participate in the attack. I-22 was to serve as flagship of the Special Attack unit.

On 18 November 1941, the five submarines moved from Kure to the Kamegakubi Naval Proving Ground, where each embarked a Type A midget submarine. At 02:15 on 19 November 1941, the five submarines got underway from Kamegakubi bound for the Hawaiian Islands, taking a direct route that took them south of Midway Atoll. While at sea, they received the message "Climb Mount Niitaka 1208" from the Combined Fleet on 2 December 1941, indicating that war with the Allies would commence on 8 December 1941 Japan time, which was on 7 December 1941 on the other side of the International Date Line in Hawaii.

World War II

Pearl Harbor
She launched No. 15 at 01:16. She sighted the silhouettes of two ships resembling heavy cruisers at 02:00 and submerged. She heard a heavy explosion at 07:12, followed by a second at 07:13 and a third at 08:18.

No. 15 apparently succeeded in penetrating the defenses of Pearl Harbor. At 08:30, while the air attack on the harbor was underway, the destroyer minesweeper  reported sighting a midget submarine — likely No. 15 —  astern of the repair ship . The destroyer minelayer  next sighted the submarine, followed by the seaplane tender , which opened fire on it, as did Medusa and the seaplane tender . The submarine fired a torpedo at Curtiss, then broached. Before it could submerge again, .50-caliber machine-gun fire raked it and a  shell hit its conning tower, decapitating its commanding officer. The submarine turned toward Monaghan and fired its second and last torpedo, which missed close aboard off Monaghan′s starboard side and exploded on the shore of Ford Island. It then sank northwest of Ford Island with the loss of both members of its crew.

At sea, I-22 underwent repeated depth-charge attacks between 09:50 and 12:43, but suffered no damage. She surfaced at 18:06 and made for an area west of Lanai where plans called for the recovery of the midget submarines. She reached the area at 23:14. When none of the midget submarines arrived, she left at 06:00 on 8 December for an alternative recovery area, where she began a search on the surface for the midget submarines at 18:00, again finding none. The commander of the Special Attack Unit ordered her back to the primary recovery area off Lanai again on 9 December, but there still was no trace of the midget submarines or their crews. At 01:22 on 10 December, she received orders claiming that one of the midget submarines had achieved an unspecified "important victory" during the 7 December attack and instructing both I-22 and I-16 to continue to search for the midget submarines and their crews until dawn on 11 December. I-22 attempted to contact No. 15 by radio on 10 December, and at 18:02 began a search on the surface south of Molokai. Ultimately, none of the five midget submarines returned, and at dawn on 11 December, I-22 was off Lanai when she received orders to suspend the search and join I-18 in bombarding Johnston Island. She departed the Hawaiian Islands.

On 15 December 1941, I-22 approached Johnston Island in a rain squall. Her first two rounds bracketed the island. Her third shot set fire to an oil storage tank that fueled a nearby power station. She fired at the burning tank for ten minutes, hitting several other buildings. One  shell landed astern of the U.S. Navy transport , which was anchored inside the reef. Another shell passed over  William Ward Burrows′s forecastle, but the ship suffered no hits. She arrived at Kwajalein on 21 December 1941.

First war patrol
On 4 January 1942, I-22 departed Kwajalein in company with I-18 and I-24 on their first war patrols, assigned patrol areas off the Hawaiian Islands. She reached her assigned patrol area southeast of Oahu on 10 January and operated there uneventfully until either 18 or 20 January 1942, when she set course for the Northwestern Hawaiian Islands to reconnoiter the French Frigate Shoals to determine whether U.S. forces were present there. She conducted a brief reconnaissance of the French Frigate Shoals on 24 January 1942, then proceeded to Yokosuka, which she reached on 2 February 1942 in company with I-24.

February–April 1942
I-22 moved to Kure later in February 1942, and on 10 March 1942 she was reassigned to Submarine Squadron 8.

On 15 April 1942, I-22 got underway from Kure bound for Truk along with the other submarines of the detachment. During their voyage, 16 United States Army Air Forces B-25 Mitchell bombers launched by the aircraft carrier  struck targets on Honshu in the Doolittle Raid on 18 April 1942. The detachment received orders that day to divert from its voyage and head east-northeast at flank speed to intercept the U.S. Navy task force that had launched the strike, but the orders were canceled on 19 April and the submarines resumed their voyage to Truk, which they reached on 24 April 1942.

Second war patrol

On 30 April 1942, I-22, I-24, I-28, and I-29 got underway from Truk to form a patrol line southwest of Guadalcanal in support of Operation MO, a planned Japanese invasion of Tulagi in the Solomon Islands and Port Moresby on New Guinea. While they were en route, the Battle of the Coral Sea began on 4 May 1942 as Allied forces moved to block the  Japanese offensive. As the battle continued, the four submarines arrived in their assigned areas and formed their patrol line on 5 May 1942. While the Japanese seized Tulagi and were turned back from Port Moresby, I-22′s patrol passed quietly. She received orders on 11 May 1942 to return to Truk. While she was en route, the submarine  sighted two Japanese submarines — probably I-22 and I-24 — proceeding separately on the surface and unsuccessfully attacked one of them early on the morning of 17 May 1942, but a few hours later sank I-28, which was trailing I-22 and I-24 on the same course. I-22 arrived safely at Truk later that day.

Attack on Sydney Harbour and fourth war patrol

On the day she arrived at Truk, I-22 and embarked a Type A midget submarine. She got underway in company with I-24 and I-27 on 18 May 1942 bound for Sydney, Australia, to launch a midget submarine attack against ships in Sydney Harbour. During their voyage, the three submarines received reconnaissance reports from I-29, which launched a floatplane to reconnoiter Sydney Harbour on 23 May 1942, and I-21, whose Yokosuka E14Y1 (Allied reporting name "Glen") floatplane conducted a reconnaissance flight early on the morning of 29 May 1942 and sighted the heavy cruiser  at Sydney, mistakenly reporting her as a battleship. That day, the commander of the Eastern Advanced Detachment ordered the three submarines to launch the midget submarine attack.

On 30 May 1942, I-22, I-24, and I-27 arrived off Sydney. Between 17:21 and 17:40 on 31 May, each launched her midget submarine to begin what became known as the attack on Sydney Harbour. I-22′s midget, M21, reached the harbor, where the patrol boat  tried to ram her, then dropped depth charges. M21 survived Yandra′s attack, but when the patrol vessel  attacked her off Taylors Bay and disabled her, M21′s two-man crew shot themselves to death. Allied forces later found M21 on the harbor bottom with her motor still running. I-24′s and I-27′s midget submarines also were lost.

I-22, I-24, and I-27 loitered off Sydney until 3 June 1942 in the hope of recovering their midget submarines, then gave up hope and departed the area, splitting up to begin anti-shipping patrols. I-22 was tasked to conduct a reconnaissance of Wellington and Auckland, New Zealand, and Suva in the Fiji Islands. She attacked a small steamer off Portland Island at 14:18 on 10 June, but her torpedo passed under the steamer′s hull without exploding and the ship escaped. She reconnoitered Hauraki Gulf and Auckland after dark that evening, Suva on 17 and 18 June, and Auckland again on 19 June. and arrived at Kwajalein with I-21, I-24, I-27, and I-29 on 25 June 1942. She left Kwajalein on 5 July bound for Yokosuka, which she reached on 11 July 1942.

Fourth war patrol
During I-22′s stay at Yokosuka, the Guadalcanal campaign began on 7 August 1942 with U.S. amphibious landings on Guadalcanal, Tulagi, Florida Island, Gavutu, and Tanambogo in the southeastern Solomon Islands. On 11 September 1942, I-22 departed Yokosuka bound for the Solomon Islands to conduct her fifth war patrol, and while at sea received orders on 15 September 1942 to join a patrol line southwest of Rennell Island. She was never heard from again.

Loss

The plane dropped four depth charges. Oil and bubbles appeared on the surface, marking the end of I-22 with the loss of all 100 men on board.

On 12 November 1942, the Imperial Japanese Navy declared I-22 to be presumed lost with all hands. She was stricken from the Navy list on 15 December 1942.

After World War II, the U.S. Joint Army-Navy Assessment Committee officially credited the U.S. Navy PT boat PT-122 with sinking I-22 off the Kumusi River on the coast of New Guinea during the night of 23–24 December 1942. This subsequently was disproved.

Notes

References
 

 

Type C1 submarines
Ships built by Kawasaki Heavy Industries
1938 ships
Attack on Pearl Harbor
World War II submarines of Japan
Japanese submarines lost during World War II
World War II shipwrecks in the Pacific Ocean
Shipwrecks in the Coral Sea
Ships lost with all hands
Maritime incidents in October 1942
Submarines sunk by aircraft
Ships sunk by US aircraft